Marianka is a village in Slovakia.

Marianka may also refer to the following places:
Marianka, Biłgoraj County in Lublin Voivodeship (east Poland)
Marianka, Lublin County in Lublin Voivodeship (east Poland)
Marianka, Podlaskie Voivodeship (north-east Poland)
Marianka, Gmina Strzelce in Łódź Voivodeship (central Poland)
Marianka, Gmina Żychlin in Łódź Voivodeship (central Poland)
Marianka, Łowicz County in Łódź Voivodeship (central Poland)
Marianka, Opoczno County in Łódź Voivodeship (central Poland)
Marianka, Radomsko County in Łódź Voivodeship (central Poland)
Marianka, Skierniewice County in Łódź Voivodeship (central Poland)
Marianka, Tomaszów Mazowiecki County in Łódź Voivodeship (central Poland)
Marianka, Puławy County in Lublin Voivodeship (east Poland)
Marianka, Włodawa County in Lublin Voivodeship (east Poland)
Marianka, Gostynin County in Masovian Voivodeship (east-central Poland)
Marianka, Gmina Kałuszyn in Masovian Voivodeship (east-central Poland)
Marianka, Gmina Mińsk Mazowiecki in Masovian Voivodeship (east-central Poland)
Marianka, Piaseczno County in Masovian Voivodeship (east-central Poland)
Marianka, Żyrardów County in Masovian Voivodeship (east-central Poland)
Marianka, Lubusz Voivodeship (west Poland)
Marianka, Pomeranian Voivodeship (north Poland)
Marianka, Warmian-Masurian Voivodeship (north Poland)